Bryant is an unincorporated community in McHue Township, Independence County, Arkansas, United States. It is located on Arkansas Highway 25, south of Batesville.

References

Unincorporated communities in Independence County, Arkansas
Unincorporated communities in Arkansas